This is a list of Seamounts in the Southern Ocean. A seamount is a mountain rising from the ocean seafloor that does not reach to the water's surface (sea level), and thus is not an island, islet or Cliff-rock.

List

See also 
List of submarine volcanoes

References